Clitoria brachystegia is a species of flowering plant in the family Fabaceae. It is found only in Ecuador. Its natural habitat is subtropical or tropical dry forests.

References

brachystegia
Flora of Ecuador
Endangered plants
Taxonomy articles created by Polbot